The Brigham Young University Law Review is a law journal edited by students at Brigham Young University's J. Reuben Clark Law School. The journal publishes six issues per annual volume, with each issue generally including several professional articles and a number of student notes and comments.

Annual symposia 
The Brigham Young University Law Review typically publishes the proceedings of the annual International Law & Religion Symposium, sponsored by the BYU International Center for Law & Religious Studies, in the second issue of each volume. It also hosts and publishes the concomitant work of an annual faculty-organized symposium on a salient legal topic.

Notable articles

References

External links
 
 The J. Reuben Clark Law School
 BYU International Center for Law & Religious Studies

American law journals
General law journals
Publications established in 1975
Bimonthly journals
English-language journals
Law journals edited by students